Rao Satal Dev Ji Rathore (1489–1492) was a 15th-century ruler of Marwar. He was the son of Rao Jodha. Rao Satal is considered as one of the greatest martyrs of his race,
as he sacrificed his own life to keep the honour of his subjects.

On hearing that Afghan soldiers had abducted 140 girls from a village near Merta, he set out with an army to rescue the girls. Satal led his men to rescue the girls despite a Rajput tradition of not engaging in battle after sunset. The Afghan warlord Gudhla Khan had Herculean strength and the armour he wore was so heavy that no weapon could pierce it, Rao Satal was fatally wounded while fighting Gudhla but he was able to kill him by severing his head through an opening in his armour. Rao Satal saved the girls and personally escorted them to their village, but he succumbed to his wounds and died that night. The head of Gudhla was then taken by one of the girls and it was paraded around the town to show that Gudhla had been slain by the brave Rathore chieftain and that their honour remained untarnished.

In commemoration of this event, a festival is held in Marwar in March. At sunset, on the appointed day, young married girls make their way to the local potter’s home to get an earthen pot, which is riddled with holes. The girls place an oil lamp in the earthen pot and the procession wends its way through the streets with the pot held high midst a chanting of folk song Gudhla ghoomelaji. The lamp is paraded in a similar manner as to how Gudhlas's head was paraded by the maidens after they were saved and reached their village. After sunset, the pot is taken to the nearest lake and gently cast away.

The riddled pot symbolises the head of Gudhla Khan and the festival acknowledges the long-dead king who lost his life in the protection of his subjects. 

Rao Satal's had seven wives including Rani Bhatiyani Harakhabai, daughter of Kelhan Bhati and Rani Bhatiyani Phulam or Phool Kanwar, who built Phulelao Talab in 1490. All of them became sati following his death.

References

15th-century Indian monarchs
Monarchs of Marwar
Year of birth missing
1502 deaths